Freinsheim station is a station in Freinsheim in the German state of Rhineland-Palatinate. It is at the junction of the Palatinate Northern Railway and the Freinsheim–Frankenthal railway. The station is one of the most important railway junctions in the Palatinate. It is classified by Deutsche Bahn as a category 4 station.

History

The station was opened on 20 July 1860 as part of the Bad Dürkheim–Grünstadt section on the Palatine Northern Railway. On 15 October 1877, the station was upgraded with the opening of the line to Frankenthal.

Infrastructure

The station has three platforms tracks and two platforms. One platform is used by trains towards Neustadt or Grünstadt on the Palatinate Northern Railway, while the other platform is used by trains coming from Frankenthal or Grünstadt running on the Freinsheim–Frankenthal line. The station building, which was built as a single block, is no longer used.

The station is located on the western outskirts of Freinsheim. To the south of the station is the junction of the Freinsheim–Frankenthal line with the Palatine Northern Railway. The station has an important function as a node in the Palatinate due to its central location in the Frankenthal-Grünstadt-Bad Dürkheim triangle.

The station building, a three-story stucco building with a sandstone portico and a wooden roof, was built in 1872/73 and is a listed building.

Operations

Freinsheim station is served exclusively by local services. The two lines are operated mainly by class 628 electric multiple units. Services run between Neustadt and Freinsheim every half hour on week days.  Once an hour these continue to Grünstadt. Trains from Frankenthal end in Ramsen on weekdays; they only continue to Eiswoog on Sundays and public holidays.

Notes

Railway stations in Rhineland-Palatinate
Railway stations in Germany opened in 1860